Endiandra compressa, the white bark, is a rainforest tree growing in eastern Australia. The habitat is rainforest growing near streams in valleys. The range of natural distribution is from the Nambucca River, New South Wales to Kutini-Payamu National Park, in north Queensland.

Description
A tree reaching 30 metres tall and a trunk diameter of 75 cm. The base of the tree may be buttressed in larger trees. The bark is pale, light grey or almost white. Small branches are smooth, and green at the ends.

Leaves are simple and alternate, lanceolate in shape, 8 to 18 cm long. 3 to 5 cm wide. Glossy green above and below. Leaf veins are evident above and below the leaf.

Creamy or yellow flowers form on short panicles from leaf axils in the months of November to December. Sometimes flowers form from the branchlets above the leaf scars.

Fruit matures in January being a large fleshy drupe, 3 to 5 cm in diameter. Black or bluish black in colour. The fruit is mostly round, but laterally flattened (or compressed). Hence the species name compressa. Inside is a single large seed. Removal of the flesh should be undertaken before planting the seed.

Ecology
The butterfly, Chaetocneme porphyropis feeds on the leaves of this tree.

References

 
 

Trees of Australia
Flora of New South Wales
Flora of Queensland
Laurales of Australia
compressa